Garnet Vere "Jerry" Portus MA., B.Litt. (Oxon) (7 June 1883 – 16 June 1954) was an Australian academic.

History
Portus was born in Morpeth, New South Wales, a son of Henry Dumaresq Portus, local manager for the Newcastle and Hunter River Steamship Company. Canon Harold S. D. Portus (c. 1874 – 20 April 1941), rector of St. Peter's Church, East Maitland was a brother.

Portus was a student at Maitland Public High School and after leaving joined the Mines Department, but three years later, at the urging of (Anglican) Bishop Stanton of Newcastle studied at St Paul's College, Sydney University, graduating with First-class Honours. He was a fine athlete and a star (Rugby Union) footballer, and in 1907 won a Rhodes Scholarship, which took him to Oxford University, where he achieved his MA in 1909 and B.Litt. two years later.

He acted as Professor of History and Economy at Adelaide University 1913–1914 while Professor Henderson was on leave.

He was ordained a priest and served the Church of England as rector of Cessnock. He served as a censor during the Great War, while studying for his MA, which he achieved in 1917.

He was employed as lecturer in Economic History at Sydney University and director of tutorial classes.

He was appointed Professor of Political Science and History at Adelaide University in 1934, retiring in 1948, but continued to lecture until shortly before his death. He died at his North Adelaide home shortly after attending a function for a visiting team of Rugby Union footballers from Fiji.

Other interests
He was keenly interested in cricket
He was a double rowing blue at Oxford
He played Rugby Union for Oxford and in 1908 captained the English Rugby Union side
He was an Australian Rugby selector in 1934
He was a regular and popular broadcaster on a wide range of subjects
He was a member of the ABC talks advisory committee
He strongly supported the League of Nations Union
He was a member of the think tank Common Cause that met during WWII to discuss post-war reconstruction
He was a member, Federal Council of the Australian Association of the United Nations.

Recognition
A house at Maitland High School was named after him.

He was cited as mentor and inspiration for Helen Patricia Jones (1926–2018).

Family
He married Ethel M. Ireland, of Newcastle in 1912. A son, John Portus, was Conciliation Commissioner.

Bibliography
Portus, G. V. Caritas Anglicana Mowbray & Co., Oxford.
Portus, G. V. (1921) Marx and Modern Thought
Portus, G. V. (1928) The American Background
Portus, G. V. (1931) Communism and Christianity
Portus, G. V. (1933) Australia — An Economic Interpretation
Portus, G. V. (1944) They Wanted to Rule the World
Portus, G. V. (1953) Happy Highway, his autobiography

References 

1883 births
1954 deaths
Academic staff of the University of Adelaide
Australian Rhodes Scholars